Harry Enfield's Brand Spanking New Show is a British sketch show (sketch comedy) starring Harry Enfield. It was first broadcast on Sky 1 in 2000 for one series.

The series followed Enfield's first project Harry Enfield's Television Programme. Seven years later, Enfield return with Harry and Paul, once again on the BBC. Enfield admitted in 2010 that he didn't give the series his full attention as he was involved in the editing of Kevin & Perry Go Large at the same time as the show's production, so the show suffered as a result.

A compilation of some of the best sketches from the series was released on DVD in 2002.

References

External links
 

2000s British television sketch shows
2000 British television series debuts
2000 British television series endings
British television sketch shows
English-language television shows
Harry Enfield
Sky UK original programming
Television series by Banijay
Television series by Tiger Aspect Productions